is a Japanese professional football midfielder.

Career
Born in Hiroshima, Hiroshima, Tasaka began his career with hometown side Sanfrecce Hiroshima. He was a regular in the academy sides and won the 2003 J-League Youth Cup alongside the likes of Yojiro Takahagi and Issei Takayanagi. After graduating high school Tasaka received an offer from first team, but he decided to continue his study and play football at the Aoyama Gakuin University.

Upon graduating university Tasaka joined Kawasaki Frontale in 2007 and inherited jersey number 6. He made his J-League debut in a 4–0 defeat against Kashiwa Reysol on 23 September 2007.

Tasaka left Kawasaki to sign for VfL Bochum on 24 July 2012. He made his Bochum debut against Dynamo Dresden in the 2. Bundesliga on 12 August 2012.

Career statistics

1Includes Emperor's Cup and DFB-Pokal.
2Includes J. League Cup.
3Includes AFC Champions League.

References

External links

Profile at Kawasaki Frontale 
 

1985 births
Living people
Aoyama Gakuin University alumni
Association football midfielders
Association football people from Hiroshima Prefecture
Japanese footballers
J1 League players
2. Bundesliga players
Kawasaki Frontale players
VfL Bochum players
JEF United Chiba players
Expatriate footballers in Germany
Japanese expatriate footballers
Japanese expatriate sportspeople in Germany